Sexual XXXXX! is the second studio album by the Japanese rock band Buck-Tick. It was the group's major label debut and was released on vinyl, cassette and CD on November 21, 1987 through on Victor Entertainment. The album was digitally remastered and re-released on September 19, 2002 with a different cover. Sexual XXXXX! was remastered and re-released again on September 5, 2007. The songs "Do the I Love You" and "Hyper Love" were later re-recorded for the band's compilation album Koroshi no Shirabe: This Is Not Greatest Hits (1992). "My Eyes & Your Eyes" was also re-recorded for the b-side to their "Rendezvous" single in 2007. At the time of its release, the album peaked at number 33 on the Oricon charts and as of 2011 has sold 40,000 copies.

Track listing

Personnel
 Atsushi Sakurai - lead vocals
 Hisashi Imai - lead guitar, backing vocals
 Hidehiko Hoshino - rhythm guitar, acoustic guitar, backing vocals
 Yutaka Higuchi - bass
 Toll Yagami - drums

Additional performers
 Tsutomu Nakayama - keyboards, backing vocals
 Jun-ichi Tanaka - backing vocals

Production
 Buck-Tick - producers
 Kazumitsu Higuchi; Kazuo Sawaki - executive producers
 Shuuji Yamaguchi - engineer, mixing
 Hideaki Ikeda; Kouki Fukui - assistant engineers
 Katsunori Miyake - graphic design, cover art
 Masanori Kato - photography

Notes

References

Buck-Tick albums
Victor Entertainment albums
1987 albums
Japanese-language albums